Ron Anderson may refer to:

Sportspeople
Ron Anderson (basketball, born 1958), American NBA player
Ron Anderson (basketball, born 1989), American basketball player and son of the above
Ron Anderson (ice hockey, born 1945), NHL player (Detroit, LA, St. Louis, Buffalo) and WHA player (Edmonton) born in Alberta
Ron Anderson (ice hockey, born 1948), WHA player (Chicago, Cleveland) born in Ontario
Ron Anderson (ice hockey, born 1950), NHL player (Washington Capitals) born in New Brunswick
Ron Anderson (sailor), American competitor in events such as the Star World Championship

Others
Ronald Anderson (1941–2020), American sociologist
Ron Anderson (singer) (born 1945), American singer
Ron Anderson (voice coach) (1946–2021), American voice coach
Ron Anderson (musician) (born 1959), American musician, composer, frequent collaborator with Tatsuya Yoshida
Ron Anderson (The Walking Dead), a character from The Walking Dead (TV series)

See also
Ron Andersen (1941–1997), American bridge player
Ronnie Anderson (born 1974), American NFL wide receiver